Zenitar is a series of Soviet/Russian prime lenses. They were developed and are currently produced by JSC S. A. Zverev Krasnogorskiy Mekhanicheskiy Zavod (KMZ). The series is most commonly known for the 1:2.8 16 mm fisheye lens.

The lenses can be used with cameras using the M42 lens mount as well as with other mount systems using an adaptor ring. They can also be equipped with a Pentax K mount since the flange-film distance is identical.

 MC Zenitar-K/M/N 1:2.8 16 mm full-frame fisheye
 MC Zenitar-K/M 1:2.8 20 mm
 MC Zenitar-K 1:2.8 28 mm
 MC Zenitar-К 1:1.4 50 mm
 MC Zenitar-ME1 1:1.7/50 mm
 MC Zenitar-K/M 1:1.9 50 mm
 MC Zenitar-К/M 1:2.0 50 mm
 MC Zenitar-1K 1:1.4 85 mm
 MC APO Telezenitar-M/K 1:2.8 135 mm telephoto
 MC APO Telezenitar-K/M 1:4.5 300 mm telephoto
 MC Variozenitar-K/M 1:2:8-3.5 25-45 mm zoom
 MC Variozenitar 1:3.2-4.5 35-70 mm zoom
 MC Variozenitar-K 1:3.5-4.5 35-105 mm zoom
 MC Variozenitar-K 1:4.0 70-210 mm zoom

External links 
 Notes on the MC Zenitar 16mm 2.8 fisheye lens for Canon EOS
 Krasnogorsky Zavod official site
  MC Zenitar-M 1:2.8 16 mm fisheye on Krasnogorsky Zavod official site
  Zenitar Lenses on Krasnogorsky Zavod R&D Center site
  MC Zenitar-ME1 1,7/50 on Krasnogorsky Zavod R&D Center site
  MC Zenitar 1:1:9 50 mm on Krasnogorsky Zavod R&D Center site
  MC Zenitar 2/50 on Krasnogorsky Zavod R&D Center site
  MC Variozenitar-K 2.8-3.5/25-45 on Krasnogorsky Zavod R&D Center site
  MC Zenitar-K 1.4/85 lenses on Krasnogorsky Zavod R&D Center site
  "Fish eyes" (Peleng and Zenitar) on iXBT.com

Soviet photographic lenses
Soviet brands
Russian brands
Shvabe Holding